Diana Haskell is a multi-faceted clarinetist who works as an orchestral clarinetist, educator, clinician and chamber musician. Haskell is currently Associate Principal Clarinet with the St. Louis Symphony Orchestra. In her role as Associate Principal Clarinet, the St. Louis Post-Dispatch has described her artistry as “perfectly played...with hymn-like beauty”. Since 2003 Ms. Haskell has also performed numerous times with the St. Louis Symphony Orchestra as soloist, including with Maestro David Robertson and Maestro Jahja Ling.

Haskell teaches in the tradition of the Daniel Bonade School, through her training at Eastman School of Music with D. Stanley Hasty, as well as with Mitchell Lurie, with whom she studied at Music Academy of the West. In addition, her studies with the great diagnostician Joseph Allard at Juilliard and piano training with Maria Louis-Faini have given her a well-rounded foundation for building her own teaching and coaching expertise.

Haskell is currently the Woodwind Chamber Music Coordinator at Chautauqua Institution School of Music, where she gives individual instruction to conservatory clarinetists and coaches mixed chamber groups. For five years Ms. Haskell recruited, organized and led her own Clarinet Intensive, a rigorous two-week immersion program for 5-7 advanced conservatory and high school students as part of the MasterWorks Festival. A supporter of minority arts initiatives, Ms. Haskell participates in the In Unison program with the St. Louis Symphony Orchestra as a performer, instructor and mentor at various locations in St. Louis. Haskell also teaches clarinet and is on the board for HEAL Center For the Arts, a vigorous after-school arts program in St. Louis for students in urban centers.

Haskell has taught at SUNY Buffalo, Houghton College, UW Whitewater, Savannah College of Art and Design, Armstrong State College, and Wisconsin Lutheran College. She has given master classes and clinics at universities in Japan, Europe and the United States.

Haskell's students have been accepted at Eastman School of Music, Indiana University, Roosevelt University, DePaul University, University of Missouri-Kansas City, Northwestern University, University of Minnesota, and Bowling Green State among others. Her students occupy positions with regional orchestras, in bands of the Armed Forces, as clarinet professors, and as orchestra and band directors.

After completing her Master of Music Degree at The Juilliard School and Bachelor of Music Degree at Eastman School of Music with Performer’s Certificate, she joined the Savannah Symphony Orchestra as Principal Clarinet. She also was Acting Principal Clarinet with the Charleston Symphony Orchestra for one season. Haskell then became Principal Clarinet with the Buffalo Philharmonic Orchestra with Maestro Semyon Bychkov, followed by Assistant Principal and E-Flat Clarinet in the Milwaukee Symphony Orchestra in 1991. Maestro Itzhak Perlman invited Haskell to join the St. Louis Symphony Orchestra as Assistant Principal Clarinet in 2003, and a year later Music Director David Robertson appointed her as Associate Principal and Eb Clarinet. Haskell was also Principal Clarinet with Santa Fe Opera.

As a result of being a finalist in the Naumberg International Competition, Ms. Haskell performed a solo recital in the Isaac Stern Auditorium at Carnegie Hall. Haskell was Principal Clarinet for the Grammy award-winning recording of Samuel Barber's Antony and Cleopatra, an opera directed by Gian Carlo Menotti and produced by New World Records.

Haskell’s high school studies were with James Barkow at Vandercook College. She was encouraged by her grade school band director, Cloyd Myers, to begin clarinet at age 9. Haskell was a high school camper at Interlochen Summer Arts Camp, where she studied piano with Fernando Laires, and clarinet with George Townsend and Sidney Forrest. She has been Principal Clarinet in many summer music festivals, such as Santa Fe Opera, Spoleto Festival of Two Worlds, Colorado Music Festival, Sarasota Music Festival, National Repertory Orchestra, Washington Island Chamber Music Festival, and Lake Placid Sinfonietta.

Haskell’s CD, Clarinet Enchantments (AAM Recordings) has received critical acclaim. It may be purchased at iTunes.com or at Amazon.com. There is a complete list of recordings on the Media tab at her website, DianaHaskellClarinet.

Haskell is a Buffet-Crampon Artist and plays on Buffet R-13s for all instruments. She is also a Vandoren Artist and performs on a Vandoren BD-5 mouthpiece with Vandoren's Optimum Ligature or leather ligature, and Vandoren V-12 reeds for the rest of her equipment.

Haskell’s blog, Clarinet Divas, is a teaching journal, with an emphasis on women who play the clarinet. She may also be found on Facebook at Diana Haskell, Clarinet.

Recordings
Haskell's CD, Clarinet Enchantments (AAM Recordings), also features George Silfies as pianist and clarinetist; Frances Tietov, principal harp with St. Louis Symphony Orchestra; and Peter Henderson, piano.

Critical reception
The Clarinet Magazine: "...Ms. Haskell’s expressive qualities as a soloist are highlighted as she plays with a  fluid and moving musical and tonal quality...Each selection [is] performed at the highest level, capturing all the subtleties and stylistic nuances necessary to make Ms. Haskell’s CD a must have..." (Steven Cohen)

St. Louis Post-Dispatch: “...Among the highlights was Rossini….this was a part that would challenge even a Marilyn Horne or Cecilia Bartoli. Haskell nailed it with terrific facility, lots of lyricism, and rich tone...” (Sarah Bryan Miller)

References

External links 
 "Diana Haskell, Clarinet" - Diana Haskell's official website
 "Diana Haskell, Clarinet" - Diana Haskell's Facebook page
 "Clarinet Divas" - Diana Haskell's blog

American clarinetists
Women clarinetists
Living people
21st-century clarinetists
21st-century American women musicians
Year of birth missing (living people)